Tagai Biy also known as Muhammed Kyrgyz was a Khan of the Kyrgyz Khanate from 1508 to 1517. He played a significant role in the consolidation of the Kyrgyz tribes in the Tian Shan.

Life
Tagai Biy was born in 1469 in the pasture of Sary-Bel, Alay Valley. He lost his parents early and was raised by his sister Naaly together with his brother Adyghene. Once, having quarreled with his brother Adyghene, he left for Fergana Valley and accepted Islam there. Later, when Adyghene died, Tagai returned to his homeland and for the first time held a funeral according to Muslim customs, becoming a prophet for the Kyrgyz, hence the name - «Muhammed Kyrgyz».

After the death of Sultan Khalil Khan, the Kyrgyz ceased to elect a Khan from among the Genghisids, and in 1508, on the banks of Issyk-Kul in the area of Barskoon, Tagai was raised by all Kyrgyz tribes on a white felt mat as a Kyrgyz ruler. It was officially called the «Kyrgyz Ulus». As the main attribute of power, a flag was adopted (called the «golden flag»), a separate residence (white yurt) for a single biy, etc.

Thus, in the most critical period of history, in order to consolidate all Kyrgyz clans and tribes, Tagai Biy was elected the first Kyrgyz supreme ruler. Strict rules for the management and formation of national troops are being adopted, the main goal of which is to create conditions for an independent Kyrgyz statehood. According to the Moghul historian Mirza Muhammad Haidar, by 1510 all the Moghuls had been ousted from the territory of Kyrgyzstan.

In 1511 Tagai Biy conducted a successful campaign in the Khanate of Bukhara and devastated the cities of Akhsi, Sayram, Tashkent, Turkistan and Andijan. In 1514, Tagai Biy provided military assistance to Sultan Said Khan against the ruler of Kashgaria, Mirza Abu Bakr Dughlat. Kyrgyz troops played a significant role in the battles for Kashgar, Yengisar, Hotan, Yarkent and Arslan-Bag. Tagai Biy then took rich booty, Sultan Said Khan personally bestowed special gifts on him.

In 1517, Tagai Biy made a new successful campaign against the Khanate of Bukhara and ravaged the cities of Tashkent, Sayram and Turkistan. During the siege of Turkistan, the local governor Abdullah was taken prisoner, Tagai Biy, expressing respect to him as a member of the Khan's family, released him from captivity. These actions of the Kyrgyz ruler did not please the Yarkent Khan Sultan Said Khan who wanted to use the Kyrgyz against the Shaybanids. Having openly declared that Tagai Biy was a traitor, in the autumn of 1517 he invaded the Kyrgyz possessions. In order to justify himself, Sultan Said Khan declared this attack a holy war against the «gentiles» - the Kyrgyz, who are plundering neighboring Muslim countries.

He wanted to suddenly attack Tagai Biy's headquarters under the cover of night. The battle took place on a spacious plain in the lower reaches of the Barskoon River. In this battle, the enemies prevailed, Tagai Biy was captured. In order to completely subdue the courageous and freedom-loving Kyrgyz, their ruler Tagai Biy was taken to Kashgar, to the Khan's horde as an honorary prisoner. He was in a foreign land for 5 years.

Five years later, in 1522, taking into account the prevailing historical situation, the Sultan Said Khan released Tagai Biy from prison. Thus, the Yarkent rulers wanted to attract the Kyrgyz to their side. But their attempts were in vain. And, especially since Tagai Biy himself did not agree with this. Tagai Biy, having taken a clearer position, managed to rally all the Kyrgyz around him. Later, the number of his troops grew at the expense of the Kazakh and other Turkic tribes. At that time, the son of Sultan Said Khan Abdurashid Khan (the Kyrgyz called him «Ireshe Khan») already ruled the Kyrgyz, and his headquarters was in the Kochkor valley. The khan himself visited him every year and noticed how the position and authority of Tagai Biy was strengthening every day. In 1524, in Kochkor, the Kazakh Khan Taiyr met with Tagai Biy. The main subject of negotiations was the question of joint actions for the freedom of the fraternal peoples from the Yarkent conquerors.

This event could not go unnoticed by the Yarkents. During his last visit to the territory of Kyrgyzstan, Sultan Said Khan was surprised by the strength and power of the Kyrgyz commander Tagai Biy. And returning to Kashgar, he makes the final decision to isolate the recalcitrant Kyrgyz hero, who began to fight openly against the Yarkent Khanate.

In 1526, Sultan Said Khan again captured Tagai Biy and again sent him to Kashgar, where he was held until his death.

Legacy
On November 11, 2011, a monument to Tagai Biy was erected in Karakol.
Most modern right-wing Kyrgyz tribes trace their origins to Tagai Biy.
In Kyrgyzstan, Tagai Biy is considered one of the founders of the Kyrgyz statehood.

See also
Kyrgyz Khanate
Tailak Khan
Mamatkul Biy
Atake Biy

References

Sources

Belek Soltonoev, Red Kyrgyz History, Bishkek, 1993.
Osmonakun Ibraimov, Kyrgyzstan: Encyclopedia , Bishkek, 2001.
Mirza Muhammad Haidar, Tarikh-I Rashidi.

1469 births
1533 deaths
People from Osh Region
16th-century monarchs in Asia
Muslim monarchs
Khans
Military leaders
History of Kyrgyzstan